Hapalonychia, is a condition in which a toenail or fingernail (or multiple nails) nail  becomes soft and thin, causing it to easily bend or break. This can result from an inherited condition, malnutrition, or debility.

Nails often reflect underlying systemic health and nutrition issues. Although overall well-being is not typically determined by nail health, fissures, nail fissures (or breaks) and calcium spots are minor indications of inner health. Hapalonychia is known to occur in persons with myxedema, rheumatoid arthritis, anorexia, bulimia, Hansen's disease, Raynaud phenomenon, oral retinoid therapy, and radiodermatitis.

See also
Nail anatomy

References

Conditions of the skin appendages